A tuile is a baked wafer, French in origin, generally arced in shape, that is made most often from dough (but also possibly from cheese), often served as an accompaniment of other dishes. Tuile is the French word for tile, after the shape of roof tiles that the arced baked good most often resembles. Tuiles are commonly added as garnishes to desserts such as panna cotta or used as edible cups for sorbet or ice cream.

Preparation
Tuiles are thin cookies named for and curved like the tuiles, or tiles, that line the rooftops of French country homes, particularly those in Provence. To get a curved shape, tuiles are usually made on a curved surface, such as a wine bottle or rolling pin. In France, tuile molds are also sold. Tuiles must be curved while hot; otherwise, they will crack and break. Tuiles can also be left flat after baking. The traditional tuile batter consists of flour, white sugar, melted butter, and almonds. Modern variants include a wide variety of bases and flavours (see gallery).

Gallery

References

External links

Almond cookies
Cookies
French pastries